Halipegidae is a family of trematodes belonging to the order Azygiida.

Genera:
 Dollfusiella

References

Platyhelminthes